Charlie Wedemeyer (February 19, 1946 – June 3, 2010) was a high school teacher and football coach. After being diagnosed with Lou Gehrig's disease, he continued to teach and coach football at Los Gatos High School. He was the subject of a PBS documentary and a made-for-TV movie.

Biography
Wedemeyer was the last of nine children born to Bill and Ruth Wedemeyer. He was born in Honolulu, Hawaii. He was a high school athlete and was quarterback of the Punahou School football team. He was named Hawaii Prep Athlete of the 1960s. After his graduation from Punahou in 1965 he attended Michigan State University where he played for coach Duffy Daugherty. Charlie graduated from Michigan State in 1969 and obtained a master's degree from Central Michigan University.

In 1978, while he was the head football coach at Los Gatos High School, he was diagnosed with amyotrophic lateral sclerosis. At his death, he could only move his eyes, eyebrows and lips.

The PBS documentary about the Wedemeyers, One More Season, won an Emmy Award. Michael Nouri portrayed Wedemeyer in the 1988 made-for-TV movie Quiet Victory: The Charlie Wedemeyer Story filmed at Stratford High School in Goose Creek, South Carolina. Pam Dawber portrayed Lucy Wedemeyer. Charlie and Lucy Wedemeyer wrote his autobiography, Charlie's Victory, with Gregg Lewis.

Wedemeyer died on June 3, 2010, from pneumonia, a complication caused by a recent surgery. He was the younger brother of Herman Wedemeyer, the actor who played Duke on the CBS television series Hawaii Five-O.

References

External links
 "Coming through loud and clear", by Dave Reardon, Honolulu Star-Bulletin, June 5, 2005.
 "Wedemeyer's greatest feat: beating adversity", by Bill Kwon, July 7, 2009, Honolulu Advertiser
 "Charlie Wedemeyer dies", Honolulu Advertiser
 "Charlie Wedemeyer dies", HawaiiNewsNow
 Quiet Victory: The Charlie Wedemeyer Story at IMDB.com

1946 births
2010 deaths
Punahou School alumni
Michigan State Spartans football players
Central Michigan University alumni
People from Los Gatos, California
Place of birth missing
People with motor neuron disease
Deaths from pneumonia in California
Players of American football from Honolulu
Native Hawaiian sportspeople